This is a list of Catholic churches in India.

Cathedrals
See: List of cathedrals in India#Roman Catholic

Basilicas
See: List of basilicas in India

Churches
The list of churches in this article contains churches from Catholic denominations. The information below is verifiable.

Shrines
This section does not include the minor basilicas.
 Infant Jesus Church, Bangalore
 Our Lady of Ransom Church, Kanyakumari
 St. Jude's Shrine, Jhansi
 St.Philomena's Forane Church & St. Chavara Pilgrim Centre, Koonammavu, Cochin, Kerala.
 Church of Our Lady of Snow, Kallikulam, Tamil Nadu
 Our Lady of Lourdes Shrine, Villianur, Puducherry
 Shrine of St. Antony of Padua, Kaloor Ernakulam
 Church of Our Lady of Light - Chennai
 Korattymuthy
 Shrine of Our Lady of Health, Hyderabad
 Dhori Mata Tirthalaya

Chapels
St. Aloysius Chapel - Kodialbail
Chapel of St. Catherine
Chapel of Our Lady of the Mount
Capela de Nossa Senhora da Saúde (Chorão Island)
Chapel of Sacra Familia (Chorão Island)
Chapel of St. Jerome (Chorão Island)

See also
List of Roman Catholic dioceses in India
Roman Catholicism in India

 
India
Lists of churches in India